Ryszard Burak (born 3 February 1954) is a Polish rower. He competed at the 1976 Summer Olympics and the 1980 Summer Olympics.

References

1954 births
Living people
Polish male rowers
Olympic rowers of Poland
Rowers at the 1976 Summer Olympics
Rowers at the 1980 Summer Olympics
Sportspeople from Szczecin